James Tuchet, 5th Earl of Castlehaven (died 12 August 1700) was the son of Mervyn Tuchet, 4th Earl of Castlehaven and Mary Talbot.

He succeeded his father as Earl of Castlehaven on 2 November 1686.

He married Anne Pelson, daughter of Richard Pelson and his wife, née Anne Villiers, daughter of Christopher Villiers, 1st Earl of Anglesey.

They had one son, James, who succeeded him as Earl of Castlehaven.

He died of apoplexy. His gravestone is in the floor of the south aisle of the retrochoir at Winchester Cathedral.

References

Castlehaven, James Tuchet, 5th Earl of
05
15
Year of birth unknown